Sanaga may refer to:

 Sanaga River, a river in Cameroon
 Sanaga-Maritime, an administrative department in Cameroon
 Sanaga, Republic of Buryatia, a town in Buryatia, Russia

See also
 Sanagau